The New York City Department of Youth and Community Development (DYCD) is the department of the government of New York City that supports youth and their families through a range of youth and community development programs, and administers city, state and federal funds to community-based organizations.

References

External links 
 New York City Department of Youth and Community Development

Youth and Community Development